Masama Kusini (South Masama in English) is an administrative ward in Hai District of Kilimanjaro Region in Tanzania. According to the 2012 census, the ward has a total population of 12,060.

References

Wards of Hai District
Wards of Kilimanjaro Region